is a Japanese actor, singer, songwriter and bassist. He was a vocalist and bassist of Otokogumi, the Japanese rock band which was active during late 80s and early 90s. Takahashi has appeared in more than fifty films since 1988.

Career
He was a vocalist and bassist of Otokogumi, the Japanese rock band debuted in August, 1988. The debut single titled "Daybreak" recorded the weekly Top Singles Sales on the Oricon in Japan and Otokogumi won the Best New Artist Award in the 30th Japan Record Awards. Otokogumi released 10 singles and 8 albums in total.

After the inactivation of Otokogumi in 1993, he has released songs in the genres of rock and country music. He is a big fun of Hank Williams.

Takahashi has appeared in more than fifty films since 1988.

Selected filmography

Films

Television

Dubbing
Lee Byung-hun
Beautiful Days – Lee Min-chul
All In – Kim In-ha
Everybody Has Secrets – Choi Su-hyeon
A Bittersweet Life – Kim Sun-woo
Once in a Summer – Yun Suk-young
The Good, the Bad, the Weird – Park Chang-yi
I Saw the Devil – Soo-hyun
Masquerade (BS Japan edition) – King Gwanghae/Ha-sun
Memories of the Sword – Deok-gi/Yoo-baek
The Transporter (2004 TV Asahi edition) – Darren "Wall Street" Bettencourt (Matt Schulze)

Discography
Albums
 1994  BrandNew Road to the Origin (Kazuya and Rock Fork)
 2000  Nervous Circus Kiki-Ippatu (Kazuya Takahashi with Nervous Circus)
 2020  Love from the MOUNTAIN (The Driving Cowboys)

Singles
 2011 Tokyo Boogiey Life

References

External links
 

1969 births
Living people
Male actors from Tokyo
Japanese male film actors
Japanese male television actors
Japanese male voice actors
20th-century Japanese male actors
21st-century Japanese male actors